Leilani Perese (born 1 January 1993) is a New Zealand rugby union player. She made her debut for New Zealand against Australia in the first of two test matches in 2018 in Sydney. She earned her second cap in their 45–17 victory in the second test match.

Biography 
In 2010 Perese studied for a Bachelor of Physical Education degree at the University of Auckland. She made 15 appearances for Auckland from 2012 to 2014 before switching to Counties Manukau in 2016.

Perese was included in the historic Black Ferns squad that received contracts in 2018. Three months after making her debut, she was named in the Black Ferns squad for the November tests against the United States and France. She came off the bench in her sides 67–6 routing of the Eagles. She played both matches against France, they won the first test 14–0 in Toulon, but lost the second test 27–30 in Grenoble.

Perese was selected for the Black Ferns squad for the 2019 Women's Rugby Super Series in San Diego, she featured in all four games. She faced the Wallaroos again, a year after her debut, winning both tests 47–10 and 37–8.

In 2020 she was named in the Black Ferns contracted squad. Perese appeared for Hurricanes Poua in the inaugural 2022 Super Rugby Aupiki season.

Perese was selected for the Black Ferns squad for the 2022 Pacific Four Series.

References

External links 

 Black Ferns Profile

1993 births
Living people
New Zealand female rugby union players
New Zealand women's international rugby union players